Sarritor knipowitschi is a poacher fish in the family Agonidae. It was described by Georgii Ustinovich Lindberg and Anatoly Petrovich Andriyashev in 1937, originally as a subspecies of Sarritor leptorhynchus. It is a marine, temperate water-dwelling fish which is known from the Okhotsk Sea and the Sea of Japan, in the northwestern Pacific Ocean.

References

knipowitschi
Fish described in 1937
Taxa named by Georgii Ustinovich Lindberg
Taxa named by Anatoly Andriyashev